The commune of Gahombo is a commune of Kayanza Province in northern Burundi. The capital lies at Gahombo.

References

Communes of Burundi
Kayanza Province